Mary Lee "Molly" Fitzhugh Custis (April 22, 1788 – April 23, 1853) was an Episcopal lay leader in Alexandria County (now Arlington County, Virginia, United States). She was the mother of Mary Anna Randolph Custis who was the wife of Robert E. Lee. Early in the 1820s, Molly Custis helped form a coalition of women who hoped to eradicate slavery.

Early life 
The daughter of William Fitzhugh (1741–1809) a member of the Continental Congress, and Ann Bolling Randolph Fitzhugh, Molly Custis was most likely born at Chatham Manor, in Stafford County, Virginia.

Marriage and Family 
 On July 7, 1804, she married George Washington Parke Custis, an orator, playwright, writer, and the grandson of Martha Custis Washington through her first marriage to Daniel Parke Custis. Molly Custis thus became George Washington's step-granddaughter-in-law. Molly's father William Fitzhugh and George Washington were long-time friends, with Washington mentioning in his diaries the hospitality of Molly's mother Ann Bolling Randolph Fitzhugh; a visit to William Fitzhugh turned out to be the last time Washington left Mt. Vernon before his death.

The Custises lived at Arlington House, an  plantation in Alexandria County, Virginia. Of their four daughters, only Mary Anna Randolph Custis, who later married Robert E. Lee, survived childhood; Lee's father Henry had famously eulogized President Washington at the 1799 funeral. Molly's brother, William Henry Fitzhugh, supported his niece Anne Lee and her six children by allowing them to stay at his home in Fairfax County, Ravensworth where she died in 1829. In 1824, when Robert E. Lee was 17, William Henry Fitzhugh wrote to the Secretary of War, John C. Calhoun, urging that Robert be given an appointment to the United States Military Academy at West Point.

Religious influence 
Molly Custis was a member of a family network in northern Virginia that helped revive the state's Episcopal Church in the first part of the nineteenth century. She particularly influenced her cousin, Bishop William Meade. Molly Custis promoted Sunday schools and supported the work of the American Colonization Society. Molly followed the teachings of the Second Great Awakening, with its emotional surrender to a just but inscrutable God and rejection of transient worldly pleasures.

Death 
She died at Arlington on April 23, 1853, a day after her 65th birthday and was buried on the estate. Her husband survived her by four years, at which point Arlington House and the grounds were inherited by their daughter Mary Anna Randolph Custis, Mrs. Robert E. Lee.

References

^ Death notice and tribute in Alexandria Gazette, May 16, 27, 1853.

External links
Custis and Lee family biographies by the National Park Service

1788 births
1853 deaths
People from Arlington County, Virginia
People from Stafford County, Virginia
Custis family of Virginia
Washington family
Fitzhugh family of Virginia
Bolling family of Virginia
18th-century American Episcopalians
19th-century American Episcopalians
18th-century American women
19th-century American women
Burials at Arlington National Cemetery